Metro New York was a free daily newspaper in New York City.

Background
It was launched on May 5, 2004 by Metro International.

Metro New York was primarily distributed by "hawkers" paid to station themselves in areas with high pedestrian traffic, who offer the free paper to anyone who passes by. In 2009, Metro International sold its US papers to a former executive.

In January 2020, the assets of Metro New York and Metro Philadelphia were acquired by Schneps Media, owner of AM New York. The New York papers were combined as AM New York Metro.

See also
 List of New York City newspapers and magazines

References

External links
 
 

Free daily newspapers
Daily newspapers published in New York City
Publications established in 2004
Defunct newspapers published in New York (state)
Daily newspapers published in New York (state)